The Direction générale de la Santé (DGS) is one of the Directorate-General of the French Ministry of Health.

It was created in 1956 by the merging of the Direction de l’hygiène publique and Direction de Hygiène sociale.

Mission 
Its mission is to prepare the public health politic and participate in its implementation.

References

Government of France